Vietnam Idol (now retroactively known as Vietnam Idol season 1) is the first season of the interactive reality series produced in Vietnam. The show was hosted by Thanh Thảo and Nguyên Vũ. It began airing on Ho Chi Minh Television together with many other local channels in Hanoi (HTV), Hai Phong, Da Nang (DRT), Khanh Hoa and Quang Ninh

Nguyễn Ngọc Phương Vy, from Ho Chi Minh City, was crowned the winner of the season. Her prizes included $10,000 and a contract with Music Faces, a record company in Vietnam.

Early process

Auditions 
Auditions were held at the following locations:
Can Tho: April 7, 2007
Hanoi: April 15, 2007
Danang: April 22, 2007
Ho Chi Minh City: May 5, 2007

Theater rounds 
The contestants who passed the auditions, arrived in Ho Chi Minh City for the theater round where they were given songs from the judges to perform. Based on those performances, 30 contestants were chosen by the judges to proceed to the Piano Show.

Piano rounds 
On the June 27, 2007, the Piano Show began, with the Top 30 Contestants singing in Ho Chi Minh City for the judges and the viewers. The contestants were allocated numbers so that viewers could vote for their favourite(s). The viewers were able to vote by phone or by SMS. Contestants were divided into three groups of ten with the top 3 contestants from each group advancing to the Gala Round. Eight from the three groups that did not proceed to the finals during the first three rounds, competed for the last position in the Top 10 during the Wildcards round.

Finals 
The gala round involves the contestants singing each week, with the contestant with the fewest votes each week being eliminated, until one contestant is left and crowned Vietnam Idol 2007. Before it began Thùy Dương withdrew from the Top 10 due to health issues with Ngọc Minh replacing her as he had received the second highest number of votes in the Wildcards round.

Grand finale 
On the 26th of September, the final two contestants, Phương Vy and Ngọc Ánh were given their last chance to sing for the votes of the Vietnamese public. The Grand Finale was held at Hoa Binh Theatre, Ho Chi Minh City on the 3rd of October. During the night, all Top 10 contestants returned to perform with other guest stars. With 53.44% of 723,024 votes, Phương Vy was announced the winner of Vietnam Idol 2007 ahead of Ngọc Ánh. As winner of Vietnam Idol she represented Vietnam in the Asian Idol competition.

Finalists 
(In order of elimination)

 Nguyễn Thị Thuỳ Dương, Hanoi (quit)
 Vũ Ngọc Bích, Hanoi
 Chung Thanh Phong, Ho Chi Minh City
 Trần Xuân Linh, Hanoi
 Nguyễn Thị Hải Yến, Hanoi
 Nguyễn Trà My, Hanoi
 Nguyễn Thị Thảo Trang, Ho Chi Minh City
 Trương Duy Khánh, Ho Chi Minh City
 Nguyễn Ngọc Minh, Hanoi
 Nguyễn Ngọc Ánh, Hà Tây (Runner-up)
 Nguyễn Ngọc Phương Vy, Ho Chi Minh City (Winner)

Themes 
 Week 1: Self-Expressing Songs
Original air: Aug 01  & 03 2007
Bottom 3: Ngọc Minh, Thanh Phong & Ngọc Bích
Eliminated: Ngọc Bích
Special guest(s):
Practised in:

 Week 2: Top Hits
Original air: Aug 08 & 10

Bottom 3: Ngọc Minh, Thanh Phong & Thảo Trang
Eliminated: Thanh Phong
Special guest(s):
Practised in:

 Week 3: World-Inspirational
Original air: Aug 15 & 17

Bottom 3: Ngọc Ánh, Ngọc Minh & Xuân Linh
Eliminated: Xuân Linh
Special guest(s):
Practised in:

 Week 4: Rock Night
Original air: Aug 22 & 24

Bottom 3: Duy Khánh, Thảo Trang & Hải Yến
Eliminated: Hải Yến
Special guest(s):
Practised in:

 Week 5: Trịnh Công Sơn
Original air: Aug 29 & 31

Bottom 3: Duy Khánh, Trà My & Thảo Trang
Eliminated: Trà My
Special guest(s):
Practised in:

 Week 6: Folk-Inspiration
Original air: Sep 05 & 07

Bottom 2: Ngọc Minh, Thảo TrangEliminated: Thảo TrangSpecial guest(s):Practised in: Week 7: Judges' Choice
Original air: Sep 12 & 14Top 4: Ngọc Ánh, Duy Khánh, Ngọc Minh & Phương VyEliminated: Duy KhánhSpecial guest(s):Practised in: Week 8: I Raise My Voice for My Darlings
Original air: 19 & 21Top 3: Ngọc Ánh, Ngọc Minh & Phương VyEliminated: Ngọc MinhSpecial guest(s):Practised in: Week 9: Contestants' favourite
Original air: September 26

 Grand finale
Original air: October 3

'''Final two: Ngọc Ánh & Phương VyWinner: Phương VySpecial guest(s):'' Top 10, Tuấn Hưng, Elvis Phương and other prominent music artists in Vietnam

Elimination  

 Before the finals occurred, Thuỳ Dương had stated that she was no longer in the competition due to her health, so Ngọc Minh was chosen to replace with the second highest votes in Wild Card.

Album

References 

 vietnamidol.com.vn – "Một đêm Gala rực rỡ và hoành tráng", 07-08-02. Accessed: 09-01-14.
 vietnamidol.com.vn – "Chín thí sinh của chương trình tiếp tục toả sáng", 07-08-09. Accessed: 09-01-14.
 vietnamidol.com.vn – "Danh sách bài hát của đêm Gala, thứ 4 ngày 15/7", 07-08-14. Accessed: 09-01-14.
 vietnamidol.com.vn – "Các thí sinh lên sàn diễn dù bị kiệt sức và sốt", 07-08-16. Accessed: 09-01-14.
 vietnamidol.com.vn – “Thần tượng âm nhạc” phải giống như một con “tắc kè hoa”, 07-08-21. Accessed: 09-01-14.
 vietnamidol.com.vn – "Khi người trẻ hát nhạc Trịnh", 07-08-30. Accessed: 09-01-14.
 vietnamidol.com.vn – "Tuần thứ 6 Gala – Một thách thức dành cho top 5", 07-09-07. Accessed: 09-01-14.
 vietnamidol.com.vn – Đêm của "Khúc ngẫu hứng dân gian đương đại", 07-09-07. Accessed: 09-01-14.
 vietnamidol.com.vn – "Danh sách bài hát của vòng thi Gala – tuần thứ 7", 07-09-11. Accessed: 09-01-14.
 vietnamidol.com.vn – "Đêm thử thách khán giả", 07-09-13. Accessed: 09-01-14.

External links 
 Production website

Vietnam Idol
2007 Vietnamese television seasons